Tor Håkon Holte (born 1 August 1958) is a Norwegian cross-country skier who competed from 1982 to 1987. He won the 4 × 10 km relay gold at the 1985 FIS Nordic World Ski Championships in Seefeld and finished ninth in the 50 km event at those same championships.

Holte also won the 50 km event at the Holmenkollen ski festival in 1984. His best individual finish at the Winter Olympics was eight in the 15 km event in 1984.

Holte's only other international victory was a 50 km event in Lahti in 1985.

Holte has four individual Norwegian championships on 50 km and one on 15 km.

He is the brother of Geir Holte, and a nephew of Tove and Torbjørn Paule.

Cross-country skiing results
All results are sourced from the International Ski Federation (FIS).

Olympic Games

World Championships
 1 medal – (1 gold)

World Cup

Season standings

Individual podiums
 2 victories  
 7 podiums

Team podiums
 1 victory 
 2 podiums

Note:  Until the 1999 World Championships, World Championship races were included in the World Cup scoring system.

References

External links

Holmenkollen winners since 1892 - click Vinnere for downloadable pdf file 

1958 births
Cross-country skiers at the 1984 Winter Olympics
Holmenkollen Ski Festival winners
Living people
Norwegian male cross-country skiers
Olympic cross-country skiers of Norway
FIS Nordic World Ski Championships medalists in cross-country skiing
Sportspeople from Drammen